Deanna Demuzio (February 23, 1943 – October 20, 2020) was an American politician who served as a Democratic member of the Illinois Senate. She represented the 49th District from 2004 through 2010. In May 2004, she was appointed to the Illinois State Senate following the death of her husband, former Senate Majority Leader Vince Demuzio.

Career 
Deanna Demuzio ran unopposed in November 2004 to keep the seat vacated by her husband for the rest of his term. In 2006 she was challenged by Republican candidate and Taylorville alderman Jeff Richey in the general election. On the Taylorville City Council, Richey was chairman of the Ordinance Committee, and served on the Finance, Street, Sewer, and Emergency Services committees. Demuzio defeated Richey in the 2006 general election, taking 59.75% of the vote to Richey's 40.28%. In the 2010 election, Demuzio was defeated by Sam McCann.

Demuzio served as a delegate to the 2012 Democratic National Convention.

Death 
She died on October 20, 2020, in St. Louis, Missouri at the age of 77.

References 

1943 births
2020 deaths
Democratic Party Illinois state senators
Mayors of places in Illinois
People from Carlinville, Illinois
Women state legislators in Illinois
21st-century American politicians
21st-century American women politicians
Women mayors of places in Illinois